Old Rayne is a small village in Aberdeenshire, Scotland, approximately  north west of Inverurie and  south east of Huntly along the A96 road.

Geography
Old Rayne is bordered by the River Ury.

Etymology
The word "Rayne" comes from the Scottish Gaelic Raon meaning "a field of good ground". In the area around Old Rayne are other settlements including Kirton of Rayne, Rayne North and Potts of Rayne.

Prehistory 
A bronze age stone circle dating from approx 3000BC lies 500m south east of the village. Excavations in 1856 unearthed cremations, pottery, and a greenstone archer's wristguard.

History
The lands of Rayne were granted to the bishops of Aberdeen in 1137. The Bishops then build a residence in Old Rayne, the Bistop's Manor. This was a stone building with a moat that would have been very expensive to build at that time. It was thought by Boece, in Historia Gentis Scotorum, to have been built by Alexander de Kininmund, bishop between 1329 and 1344. However excavations in 1990 and 2008, in advance of development, found that there was already a building on the site in the early 14th century.

Old Rayne became a burgh of barony in 1492 and it was part of the lands taken from the bishops of Aberdeen under the Act of Annexation of 1587. The archaeological work indicates that the Bishop's Manor was then abandoned and quarried, with stones reused in buildings elsewhere in the village.

Lourin Fair and ORCA
The village hosts Lourin Fair, a traditional country fair dating back some 500 years, held annually on the third Saturday in August. Lourin Fair is well attended and quite unusual including traditional elements such as Clydesdale Horse competition/parade; bothy concert; pipe band; It's a knockout; homecraft & produce competition; demonstrations; traditional children's games; vintage vehicles and tea/coffee with "fancy pieces"

The fair is organised by the Old Rayne Community Association (ORCA), a registered charity raising funds for community projects; the upkeep of the village hall and supporting local organisations including Toddlers; Playgroup; Scouts; Bowling and Ospreys football.

Language
Old Rayne natives speak the Aberdeenshire Doric dialect of Scots.

Religion
The nearest church is Rayne Church, Church of Scotland. The parish is "Culsalmond and Rayne linked with Daviot".

Education

There is one primary school, located centrally in the village, with the associated secondary school Meldrum Academy, a short bus journey away to Oldmeldrum.

References

External links

 The village of Old Rayne
 Old Rayne Playgroup

Villages in Aberdeenshire